The Bakhtiari Dam is an arch dam currently under construction on the Bakhtiari River within the Zagros Mountains on the border of Lorestan and Khuzestan Provinces, Iran. The main purpose of the dam is hydroelectric power production and it will support a 1,500 MW power station.

Background
Preliminary studies for the dam began in 1996 and were carried out by Mahab Qods Consulting Engineers. The studies were carried out over a period of 33 months and in March 2000, the results were given to Iran Water & Power Resources Development Co (IWPCO). In May 2005, IWPCO awarded consultation services for the project to Moshanir Consulting Engineers, Dezab Consulting Engineers, Econo-Electrowatt/Boyri and Stucky Pars Consulting Engineers. On April 30, 2007 the construction contract was awarded to China's Sinohydro Corporation. The contract is worth $2 billion and was to be funded with direct investment from China. Sinohydro signed the 118-month contract on March 15, 2011 and was expected to be working with Iran's Farab. But the Iranian government rejected Sinohydro's bid in late May 2012 and handed the project over to Khatam-al-Anbiya (KAA), which is controlled by the Iranian Revolutionary Guard Corps. The KAA commander announced on 19 December 2012 that construction of the dam had begun with access roads leading to the project site. On 25 March 2013, Iranian President Mahmood Ahmadinejad attended a groundbreaking ceremony for the dam, initiating its construction.

Construction
During construction, a total of six bridges will be built to support workers, vehicles and equipment in addition to various access roads. To divert the water, two roller-compacted concrete cofferdams will be constructed. Material to construct the dam including aggregate will come from the actual excavation of the dam site along with three quarries in the area.

Design
Its catchment area will be .

The dam will contain two spillways. The main service spillway will be an  diameter tunnel in the right abutment with two flood gates. The discharge capacity of this spillway will be . The dam's powerhouse will be located underground at the left abutment.

See also

List of power stations in Iran
International rankings of Iran

References

Aligudarz County
Hydroelectric power stations in Iran
Dams under construction
Arch dams
Dams in Khuzestan Province
Dams in the Tigris–Euphrates river system
Underground power stations